Boluan Fanzheng or Poluan Fancheng, was a period in the history of People's Republic of China during which Deng Xiaoping, then paramount leader of China, led a far-reaching program attempting to "correct the mistakes of the Cultural Revolution" launched by Mao Zedong. The program gradually dismantled the Maoist policies associated with the Cultural Revolution, rehabilitated millions of victims who were persecuted during the Revolution, initiated various sociopolitical reforms, and brought the country back to order in a systematic way. The Boluan Fanzheng period is regarded as an important transition period in China's history, which served as the bedrock of the historic Reform and Opening-up program starting on December 18, 1978.

After the Cultural Revolution ended in 1976, Deng Xiaoping first proposed the idea of "Boluan Fanzheng" in September 1977. With the help of his allies such as Hu Yaobang who later became the General Secretary of the Chinese Communist Party (CCP), Deng was able to launch the program of Boluan Fanzheng and emerged as the de facto supreme leader of China in December 1978 during the 3rd Plenary Session of the 11th Central Committee of CCP. The Boluan Fanzheng period lasted until early 1980s, after which the primary focus of CCP and the Chinese government changed from "class struggles" to "economic construction" and "modernization".

However, the Boluan Fanzheng period also saw many controversies, such as disagreement over views on Mao, the inclusion of the "Four Cardinal Principles" in China's Constitution which upheld the CCP's one-party rule in China, and legal controversies including the fact that many of the leaders and perpetrators in Cultural Revolution massacres received little or no punishment at all. The CCP has not fully declassified the documents related to the Cultural Revolution and has been restricting academic studies and public discussions of it within the Chinese society. Additionally, there have been concerns about the reversion of the Boluan Fanzheng reforms and return to one-man rule seen under Mao since Xi Jinping became CCP general secretary in 2012.

Terminology 
Literally, "Boluan Fanzheng" is a chéngyǔ (Chinese idiom) that first appeared in Spring and Autumn Annals of ancient China. The idiom means "correcting chaos/wrongs and returning to normal".

On September 19, 1977, Deng Xiaoping first proposed the idea of "Boluan Fanzheng" during a meeting with senior officials of the Ministry of Education of China, asking the officials to correct the mistakes of Cultural Revolution in the field of education.

Ideology

Debate over the criteria for testing truth 

After Mao Zedong died in September 1976, Hua Guofeng succeeded Mao as the Chairman of the Chinese Communist Party and the Chairman of the Central Military Commission. Hua largely continued Maoist policies and proposed the "Two Whatevers" ("Whatever Chairman Mao said, we will say and whatever Chairman Mao did, we will do").

In July 1977, with the support of senior officials such as Ye Jianying and Chen Yun, Deng Xiaoping was rehabilitated after being purged (twice) by Mao during the Cultural Revolution. In May 1978, Deng together with Hu Yaobang and others launched a large-scale debate across China, discussing the criteria for testing truth and criticizing the "Two Whatevers". Deng along with his allies supported the opinion that "practice is the sole criterion for testing truth", which first appeared in an article published by Guangming Daily and gained widespread support within the Chinese society.

On December 13, 1978, Deng delivered a speech at the closing ceremony of the 3rd Plenary Session of the 11th Central Committee of CCP, during which he replaced Hua Guofeng to become the paramount leader of China. In the speech titled Emancipate the Mind, Seek Truth from Facts, and Unite as One in Looking to the Future (解放思想，实事求是，团结一致向前看), Deng urged Chinese people to seek truth from facts and pointed out that if the Party, the country, and the people continued to follow the Quotations from Chairman Mao Zedong with stubborn mindset and blind superstition, then they would never move forward, and they would perish.

Invalidating the Cultural Revolution 

On September 9, 1976, Mao Zedong died, and on October 6, Hua Guofeng together with Ye Jianying and Wang Dongxing arrested the Gang of Four, putting an end to the Cultural Revolution. From November 20, 1980, to January 25, 1981, a special court under the Supreme People's Court carried out a trial of the Gang of Four and six other people, eventually announcing death penalties with a two-year reprieve for Jiang Qing and Zhang Chunqiao, and imprisonment of various terms up to life imprisonment for other members.

At the same time, in the late 1970s, Deng Xiaoping and his allies began to dismantle the Maoist line of "continuous class struggles", diverting the focus of the CCP and the Chinese government to "economic construction" and "modernization". In 1980–1981, Hua Guofeng eventually resigned from his positions as the Chairman of the CCP, the Chairman of the Central Military Commission and the Premier of the People's Republic of China.

In June 1981, at the 6th Plenary Session of the 11th Central Committee of CCP, the Communist Party unanimously passed a resolution drafted by Deng and others which comprehensively invalidated the Cultural Revolution, calling it "a domestic havoc launched mistakenly by the leader (Mao Zedong) and taken advantage of by the counter-revolutionary gangs (Lin Biao and the Gang of Four)" and that it "was responsible for the most severe setback and the heaviest losses suffered by the Party, the country, and the people since the founding of the People's Republic".

Politics and law

Rehabilitation of victims 
During the Boluan Fanzheng period, Hu Yaobang, then General Secretary of the Chinese Communist Party, was assigned by Deng Xiaoping to take charge of the rehabilitation of the victims who were persecuted in the so-called "unjust, false, erroneous cases (冤假错案)" since the Anti-rightist Campaign in 1957. Within a few years after 1978, victims of over 3 million such cases were rehabilitated. Some of the notable victims included:

 Liu Shaoqi, 2nd Chairman of the People's Republic of China, who was persecuted to death during the Cultural Revolution.
 Peng Dehuai, one of the ten Marshalls of China and the 1st Minister of National Defense, who was persecuted to death during the Cultural Revolution
 He Long, one of the ten Marshalls of China and Vice Premier of the People's Republic of China, who was persecuted to death during the Cultural Revolution.
 Xi Zhongxun, senior member of CCP and father of Xi Jinping.
 Bo Yibo, senior member of CCP and father of Bo Xilai.
 Tao Zhu, senior member of CCP.

The Constitution of China 

The first constitution of China, known as the "1954 Constitution", came into effect in 1954. However, in 1958, Mao Zedong publicly advocated the "rule of man" over the "rule of law", saying:We can't rule the majority of people by relying on law. The majority of people [can be ruled only] by relying on the cultivation of [good] habits. The army's reliance on rule by law didn't work; what's actually worked has been the 1,400-man conference. Who could remember so many clauses of a civil code or criminal law? I participated in the formulation of the Constitution, even I can't remember [it]. During the Cultural Revolution, China's Constitution was revised in 1975 and the resultant second constitution, known as the "1975 Constitution", absorbed Maoism and vocabulary such as the "absolute leadership of CCP (in China)" into its main content; the Constitution also contained some descriptions of the CCP organization while removing the positions such as the President and the Vice President of the People's Republic of China.

After the Cultural Revolution, under the guidelines of Hua Guofeng's "Two Whatevers", a third constitution (known as the "1978 Constitution") was published in 1978. Although some of the expressions associated with the Cultural Revolution were deleted from the 1978 Constitution, most of the contents from the 1975 Constitution remained in the new constitution, such as the "leadership of CCP" in China.

During the Boluan Fanzheng period, Deng Xiaoping made an important speech titled On the Reform of the System of Party and State Leadership (党和国家领导制度改革) on August 18, 1980, proposing to the National People's Congress that China needed political reforms and a systematic revision of its Constitution. Deng pointed out that the new constitution must be able to protect the civil rights of Chinese nationals and must demonstrate the principle of separation of powers; he also described the idea of "collective leadership", advocating "one man, one vote" among senior leaders to avoid the dictatorship of the General Secretary of CCP. In December 1982, the fourth Constitution of China (known as the "1982 Constitution"), was passed by the 5th National People's Congress, embodying Chinese-style constitutionalism, and much of its content remains effective as of today. Within the 1982 Constitution,

 Cultural Revolution vocabulary such as "continuous revolution under the dictatorship of the proletariat" was deleted;
the descriptions of the organization of Chinese Communist Party was excluded;
 the statement of "the country is led by the Chinese Communist Party" was deleted, but then reinstated by Xi Jinping in 2018;
 the statement of "all state organs, the armed forces, all political parties and public organizations and all enterprises and undertakings must abide by the Constitution and the law" was added;
 the positions of President of China and Vice President of China were re-established, with a two-consecutive-term limit and five years for each term, though the term limits were removed by Xi Jinping in 2018.

Academics and education

Scientists and intellectuals 
During the Cultural Revolution, academics and intellectuals were regarded as the "Stinking Old Ninth" and were widely persecuted. Notable academics, scientists and educators who died due to the Cultural Revolution included Xiong Qinglai, Jian Bozan, Lao She, Tian Han, Fu Lei, Wu Han, Rao Yutai, Wu Dingliang, Yao Tongbin and Zhao Jiuzhang. As of 1968, among the 171 senior members at the headquarters of Chinese Academy of Sciences in Beijing, 131 were persecuted, and among all the members of the academy nationwide, 229 were persecuted to death. As of September 1971, more than 4,000 staff members of China's nuclear center in Qinghai were persecuted: among them, 40 committed suicides, five were executed, and 310 were permanently disabled.

In Boluan Fanzheng period, Deng Xiaoping himself was in charge of the rehabilitation of scientists and intellectuals who were persecuted during the Cultural Revolution. In March 1978, Deng emphasized at the National Science Conference that intellectuals were part of the working class and that the core of modernization was the modernization of science and technology. Later, he also emphasized that knowledge and talented people must be respected, whereas the wrong thought such as disrespecting intellectuals must be opposed. One of Deng's notable statements was that "science and technology are primary productive forces".

Since the Boluan Fanzheng period, various new genres of literature have emerged, including the "scar literature", the "contemplative literature (反思文学) " and the "literature of reforms (改革文学)".

Education system 
China's education system came to a virtual halt during the Cultural Revolution. In the early months of the Cultural Revolution, schools and universities were closed. Primary and middle schools later gradually reopened, but all colleges and universities were closed until 1970, and most universities did not reopen until 1972. The university entrance exams were cancelled after 1966, to be replaced later by a system whereby students were recommended by factories, villages and military units. Values taught in traditional education were abandoned. In 1968, the Communist Party instituted the Down to the Countryside Movement, in which "Educated Youths" (zhishi qingnian or simply zhiqing) in urban areas were sent to live and work in agrarian areas to be re-educated by the peasantry and to better understand the role of manual agrarian labor in Chinese society.

In 1977, Deng Xiaoping restored the university entrance exam (Gaokao) after its ten-year halt, re-establishing the higher education system in China and changing the life of tens of millions. Deng viewed science and education as the fundamentals of China's Four Modernizations. A compulsory education system was proposed during the Boluan Fanzheng period and, with the support of Deng and others, the compulsory education was written into the "1982 Constitution" while China's nine-year compulsory education was eventually established in 1986 under law (Law on Nine-Year Compulsory Education). In 1985, upon the recommendation of Zhao Ziyang, then Premier of China, the National People's Congress designated "September 10" as the annual National Teacher's Day.

In addition, renowned Chinese American mathematician Shiing-Shen Chern once proposed to Deng to raise the basic salary of professors in mainland China, increasing their monthly payments by 100 Yuan, and the proposal was soon approved by Deng.

Controversies

Views on Mao Zedong 

It has been argued that the Boluan Fanzheng program launched by Deng Xiaoping had limitations and controversies, such as writing the "Four Cardinal Principles" into the 1982 Constitution which forbade Chinese citizens from challenging China's socialist path, Maoism, Marxism–Leninism as well as the leadership of the Communist Party.

Erecting the Mausoleum of Mao Zedong on Tiananmen Square and retaining the image of Mao on Tiananmen were also disputed. Furthermore, some scholars have pointed out that Deng himself had demonstrated personal limitations in his appraisal of Mao and totalitarianism. These could be seen, for example, when Deng insisted that among all that Mao had done to the Chinese people, "70% were good and 30% were bad", whereas attributing many of the disasters in Cultural Revolution to Lin Biao and the Gang of Four.

After his death, Mao has been viewed as a controversial figure worldwide. In the late 1970s, political dissidents in China such as Wei Jingsheng led the "Democracy Wall" movement in Beijing, criticizing Mao, Maoism and the one-party state in China while demanding democracy and freedom. However, Wei's initiatives were eventually suppressed by Deng.

Limited liberation and one-party state 

During the Boluan Fanzheng period as well as the following Reform and Opening-up period, Deng Xiaoping on one hand stressed the importance of "emancipating the mind", while on the other hand repeatedly warned against the so-called "Bourgeois liberalization". In addition, dozens of people like Zhang Bojun and Luo Longji who were persecuted during the Anti-Rightist Campaign did not receive rehabilitation, and Deng played an important role in carrying out the campaign in the 1950s.

In 1983, the Anti-Spiritual Pollution Campaign was launched, followed by the "Anti-Bourgeois Liberalization Campaign" which was launched in late 1986. The two campaigns were led by left-wing politicians and received some support from Deng, but both of the campaigns were called off eventually due to the interventions from Hu Yaobang and Zhao Ziyang, who were regarded as allies of Deng and were leading reformists inside the Chinese Communist Party (CCP).

After the Cultural Revolution, the Central Committee of CCP failed to systematically "clear" the elements associated with the Revolution inside Chinese society, while banning comprehensive reflections and reviews on this period of history at the societal level. Some researchers and observers have argued that the main reason why CCP takes such actions is that a comprehensive review on the Cultural Revolution would fundamentally threaten the legitimacy of CCP as the ruling party in China. Others have pointed out that even though Deng and other senior CCP officials had confessed that the Party had made numerous mistakes in the past, yet they were still guarding the one-party system for CCP in China.

Legal controversies 

Massacres took place across mainland China during the Cultural Revolution. However, during the Boluan Fanzheng period, many of the leaders and perpetrators of these massacres either received minor punishment (such as getting expelled from CCP) or received no punishment at all, sparking public outrage. Relatives of some victims in the massacres visited Beijing in person, petitioning for justice.

 In Guangxi Massacre, 100,000-150,000 people were killed according to official investigations, and massive cannibalism occurred. However, people who took part in the massacre or cannibalism received no punishment at all or relatively minor punishments—up to 14 years in prison.
 In Inner Mongolia Incident, 20,000-100,000 people were killed, but Teng Haiqing, the leader who was in charge of this massive purge, did not receive any legal trial or punishment at all because he was considered by the CCP to have made achievements in the past wars.
 In Daoxian Massacre of Hunan Province, 9,093 people were killed. However, only a small number of perpetrators were ever punished, and none of them was sentenced to death. Several leaders of the massacre were either expelled from the CCP or received various terms of imprisonment; in Dao County, the epicenter of the massacre, only 11 people were ever prosecuted, receiving up to 10 years in prison.

Blocking Cultural Revolution museums 
In the 1980s, notable scholars such as Ba Jin called on the Chinese society to erect "Cultural Revolution museums" so that the future generations could learn from this period of history and prevented it from happening again. The proposal received support from many Chinese citizens, but the Communist Party offered no response. On the contrary, Ba Jin suffered from personal attacks during the "Anti-Spiritual Pollution Campaign" and the "Anti-Bourgeois Liberalization Campaign" launched by left-wing conservatives in the 1980s.

In 1996, the local government of Shantou, Guangdong decided to erect the first Cultural Revolution museum in mainland China, the Shantou Cultural Revolution Museum, which was opened to the public in 2005. However, the museum was forced to close in 2016 under Xi Jinping's administration.

See also 

 Chinese economic reform (Reform and Opening-up)
 Seek truth from facts
 Socialism with Chinese characteristics
Deng Xiaoping Theory
Beijing Spring
Democracy Wall
1983 "Strike Hard" Anti-crime Campaign
1986 Chinese student demonstrations
Song: Story of Spring
TV series: Deng Xiaoping at History's Crossroads
De-Stalinization

References

Further reading 

 Ezra F. Vogel. Deng Xiaoping and the Transformation of China. . 2013.
 Carol Lee Hamrin, Suisheng Zhao and A. Doak Barnett. Decision-making in Deng's China: Perspectives from Insiders. . 1995.
Gao Yong. To be a Secretary of Hu Yaobang. Hong Kong: Joint Publishing Ltd. 2014.

Reform in China
Cold War history of China
Cultural Revolution
1970s in China
1980s in China
Ideology of the Chinese Communist Party
Deng Xiaoping
Political repression
Persecution of intellectuals